Vladimir Alekseyevich Tumayev (born 10 December 1946) is a Russian businessman, football official and a former player. He last served as the president of FC SOYUZ-Gazprom Izhevsk, formerly known as FC Gazovik-Gazprom Izhevsk, the post he held since the 1990s until 2010.

Career 
He is most known for actually playing for his team, making his professional debut at 45 years of age and playing well into his fifties, while his team was playing on the second-highest level of football in Russia, Russian Football National League. He would usually come in as a substitute close to the end of the game which was already decided. He played his last professional game so far in the Russian Second Division on 29 October 2005 against FC Neftekhimik Nizhnekamsk on the last day of the season, scoring a goal in a 3:2 victory (his penalty kick was saved by Neftekhimik goalkeeper, but he scored on a rebound). He was 58 years, 10 months and 19 days old on that day, making him the oldest professional soccer player ever in Russia and, possibly, Europe. In January 2009, he composed a song about Gazprom, which was reviewed as 'extremely kitsch' by France 24.

Controversies 
On 20 February 2018, Vladimir Tumayev was charged with organizing an attempt to murder his business partner Vadim Styazhkin, committed by a group of persons by prior agreement, and on 22 February, he was placed under house arrest by the decision of the industrial district court of Izhevsk. But on 6 March, at the request of the Prosecutor, the Supreme court of Udmurtia decided to detain him. On 16 April, the term of imprisonment was extended until 12 June. His trial started on 10 September 2019. His charge was reduced from organizing a murder attempt to "organizing an intentional infliction of grievous bodily harm".

References

External links 
 Играющий директор
 Владимир Тумаев: Мне предлагали стать президентом «Зенита»
 Владимир Тумаев. В погоне за результатом
 The Gazprom Song (with English subtitles)

1946 births
People from Saratov Oblast
Living people
Soviet footballers
Russian footballers
20th-century Russian businesspeople
21st-century Russian businesspeople
Association football forwards